Vipin Sanghi (born 27 October 1961) is an Indian Judge. Presently, he is Chief Justice of Uttarakhand High Court. He is former Judge of Delhi High Court. He has also served as Acting Chief Justice of Delhi High Court.

Career
He was born on 27 October 1961 at Nagpur, Maharashtra. He did his schooling in Delhi and passed out from Delhi Public School, Mathura Road. He did L.L.B. from University of Delhi. He was enrolled as an Advocate with the Bar Council of Delhi in year 1986. He has practiced on the Civil and Constitutional side in the Supreme Court of India and Delhi High Court. He was designated as Senior Advocate by Delhi High Court in December 2005. He was elevated as an Additional Judge of Delhi High Court on 29 May 2006 and made permanent on 11 February 2008. He was appointed Acting Chief Justice of Delhi High Court on 10 March 2022 and took over as Acting Chief Justice on 13 March 2022 consequent to the retirement of Chief Justice DN Patel. He was elevated as Chief Justice of Uttarakhand High Court on 28 June 2022.

References 

Indian judges
1961 births
Living people